The Acta Triumphorum or Triumphalia, better known as the Fasti Triumphales, or Triumphal Fasti, is a calendar of Roman magistrates honoured with a celebratory procession known as a triumphus, or triumph, in recognition of an important military victory, from the earliest period down to 19 BC.  Together with the related Fasti Capitolini and other, similar inscriptions found at Rome and elsewhere, they form part of a chronology referred to by various names, including the Fasti Annales or Historici, Fasti Consulares, or Consular Fasti, and frequently just the fasti.

The Triumphales were originally engraved on marble tablets, which decorated one of the structures in the Roman forum.  They were discovered in a fragmentary state as the portion of the forum where they were located was being cleared to provide building material for St. Peter's Basilica in 1546.  Recognized by scholars as an important source of information on Roman history, they were taken to the Palazzo dei Conservatori on the nearby Capitoline Hill, and reconstructed.  As part of the collection of the Capitoline Museums, the Fasti Triumphales are one of the most important sources for Roman chronology.

History

The Fasti Triumphales were probably engraved in 18 BC, in order to adorn the Arch of Augustus, which had recently been constructed in the forum.  They were contemporary with the Fasti Capitolini, or Capitoline Fasti, a list of the chief magistrates at Rome from at least the beginning of the Republic down to the same period as the Triumphales.  Alternately, they may have been built into the wall of the Regia, an ancient building that was reconstructed in 36 BC, which was the official residence of the Pontifex Maximus, and the site where the Annales Maximi, official records of Roman history from at least the fifth century BC down to the second, were stored.  The Fasti Capitolini were most likely on the west and south sides of the Regia, and the Triumphales may have occupied part of the south wall.

Both lists were discovered by the scholars Onofrio Panvinio and Pirro Ligorio, as they observed the demolition of ancient structures in the forum by a local company of quarrymen working to obtain building material for St. Peter's Basilica.  Some of the stone would be reused in the structure, while other portions would be used to make cement.  Recognizing the value of the inscriptions, the two ordered the sinking of new trenches, in hopes of recovering additional fragments.  In all, they rescued thirty pieces of the Fasti Capitolini, and twenty-six of the Triumphales, which they brought to the Palazzo dei Conservatori on the instructions of Cardinal Alessandro Farnese.  The lists were then reconstructed by Ligorio and Michelangelo.

With additional excavations, the number of fragments of the Triumphales has grown to thirty-eight.  The known portions of the fasti were published in the first volume of the Corpus Inscriptionum Latinarum in 1863, and together with the Capitolini, they form part of the collection of the Capitoline Museums, where they are displayed in the Sala dei Fasti, the Salon of the Fasti.

Contents
The Triumphal Fasti list all of the magistrates who celebrated a triumph from the legendary founding of the city by Romulus down to 19 BC.  The earliest entries record triumphs by the Roman kings.  The Fasti also include entries for magistrates who received an ovation, or "lesser triumph".  They were evidently carved on four pilasters, each eleven feet tall.  The first covered the years down to 302 BC, the second to 222, the third to 129, and the last to the end.

Each entry gives the full name of the magistrate who triumphed, beginning with his praenomen (normally abbreviated), nomen gentilicium, filiation, and cognomina (if any).  Following these names are the magistracy or promagistracy held, the names of the defeated enemies or conquered territories, and the date that the triumph was celebrated.  Roman numerals indicate those individuals who held the magistracy in question multiple times, or who received multiple triumphs.  Each entry also has the year of the triumph indicated in the right margin.  The years given in the Triumphales are one year earlier than those of the Varronian chronology.

There are several gaps in the Fasti Triumphales.  The first occurs following the second triumph attributed to Romulus, and presumably would have included further triumphs attributed to Romulus, or to Tullus Hostilius, the third King of Rome.  Major gaps occur from 437 to 369 BC, from 291 to 282, 222 to 197, 187 to 178, 81 to 62, and 54 to 45.  The missing sections include three of the triumphs of Camillus, the entire period of the Second Punic War, and all but the last triumph celebrated by Caesar.  Shorter gaps occur from 502 to 496, 494 to 486, 329 to 326, 263 to 260, 191 to 189, 104 to 98, and 34 to 29 BC.

Transcription

The following table lists the entries from the surviving portions of the Fasti Triumphales.  The columns on the left give the years according to the Varronian chronology, which begins one year earlier than the years given in the Triumphales.  The years AUC from the original inscription are given in the column on the right.

Reading the fasti
Portions of names and text in square brackets have been interpolated.  Periods (full stops) have been supplied for abbreviations.  An m-dash is used for missing or unknown filiations or other abbreviated praenomina.  Other missing text is indicated with an ellipsis in brackets, [...].  This table uses modern conventions for distinguishing between I and J, and between U and V.  Otherwise, the names and notes are given as spelled in the fasti.  Archaic Roman spellings, such as Aimilius for Aemilius, have been preserved.  A guide to reading Roman dates and a list of the peoples and places referred to in the Fasti follow the table.

Magistracies
 cos. = consul
 pro cos. = proconsul
 pr. = praetor
 pro pr. = propraetor
 dict. = dictator
 IIIvir r. p. c. = triumvir rei publicae constituendae, triumvir to restore the Republic
 imp. = imperator, originally a title bestowed on a victorious general by his soldiers, later assumed as part of the style of the emperors

Praenomina
The following praenomina appear in the Fasti Triumphales.  All but a few were regularly abbreviated.  A few uncommon praenomina found in the Fasti Capitolini do not appear in the Fasti Triumphales.

 A. = Aulus
 Agrippa (not abbreviated)
 Ancus (not abbreviated)
 Ap. = Appius
 C. = Gaius
 Cn. = Gnaeus
 K. = Kaeso or Caeso
 L. = Lucius
 M. = Marcus
 M'. = Manius
 N. = Numerius
 P. = Publius
 Q. = Quintus
 Ser. = Servius
 Sex. = Sextus
 Sp. = Spurius
 T. = Titus
 Ti. = Tiberius
 Volusus (not abbreviated)

First tablet

Second tablet

Third tablet

Fourth tablet

Dates
The Romans dated events counting back from certain days in each month: the Kalends, marking the beginning of each month; the Ides, occurring on the fifteenth of March, May, Quintilis (July), and October, and the thirteenth of all other months; and the Nones, occurring on the seventh day of March, May, Quintilis, and October, and the fifth of all other months.  Perhaps because these dates were remnants of the old lunar calendar, the Romans counted inclusively, so that the first day of the month was reckoned the first day before the Kalends.  The last day of the previous month was ante diem ii. Kalendas, or pridie Kalendas, and the day before that was ante diem iii. Kalendas.

As a highly inflected language, Latin uses different cases depending on whether an event occurs on or from a day (ablative: Kalendis, Nonis, Idibus), or before a day (accusative: Kalendas, Nonas, Idus), but in each case the day is feminine and plural.  The name of the month to which the day belonged is treated as an adjective modifying the day, and is therefore also feminine, plural, and either ablative or accusative.  A few triumphs occurred in Interkalaris, or Mercedonius, an intercalary month used prior to Caesar's calendar reforms in 46 BC, and inserted following February in some years.  Some of the dates in the Fasti Triumphales refer to specific religious festivals; for instance several triumphs were held Quirinalibus, "on the Quirinalia", and at least one was held on the Terminalia.  The following table gives the inflected forms of the months used in the fasti:

Nominative (m. s.)
 Januarius
 Februarius
 Interkalaris
 Martius
 Aprilis
 Maius
 Junius
 Quintilis
 Sextilis
 September
 October
 November
 December

Accusative (f. pl.)
 Januarias
 Februarias
 Interkalares
 Martias
 Apriles
 Maias
 Junias
 Quintiles
 Sextiles
 Septembres
 Octobres
 Novembres
 Decembres

Ablative (f. pl.)
 Januariis
 Februariis
 Interkalaribus
 Martiis
 Aprilibus
 Maiis
 Juniis
 Quintilibus
 Sextilibus
 Septembribus
 Octobribus
 Novembribus
 Decembribus

Thus, a date abbreviated "iii. Non. Oct." represents ante diem tertium Nonas Octobres, i.e. the third day before the Nones of October, or October 5, while "Idib. Dec." represents Idibus Decembribus, occurring precisely on the Ides of December, or December 13, and "pridie K. Quint." would be pridie Kalendas Quintiles, or the last day of June.  After the death of Caesar, the month of Quintilis officially became Julius (accusative feminine plural Julias, ablative Juliis), and in 8 BC, Sextilis became Augustus (accusative feminine plural Augustas, ablative Augustis), but the latter month does not appear in the Triumphal Fasti, which end in 19 BC.

Peoples and places
All of the people and places mentioned in the Fasti Triumphales occur in the ablative case: de Samnitibus means, roughly, "(he triumphed) over the Samnites"; pro cos. ex Hispania means "proconsul of (literally out of or from) Spain".  In this list, the first form is the one appearing in the fasti, and the second is the nominative, or uninflected form.  The suffix -que, usually abbreviated -q., means "and", combining the preceding words with the one to which it is attached; de Veientibus Sabineisque means "over the Veientes and the Sabines".

Peoples

 Aequeis = Aequi (Aequians)
 Aetoleis = Aetoli (Aetolians)
 Allobrogibus = Allobroges
 Anagneis = Anagni
 Antemnatibus = Antemnates
 Antiatibus = Antiates
 Apuaneis = Apuani
 Apuleis = Apuli (Apulians)
 Arverneis = Arverni
 Asculaneis = Asculani
 Aurunceis = Aurunci
 Baliaribus = Baleares
 Boieis = Boii
 Bruttieis = Bruttii (Bruttians)
 Caenensibus = Caeninenses
 Caleneis = Caleni
 Campaneis = Campani (Campanians)
 Celtibereis = Celtiberi (Celtiberians)
 Contrubrieis = Contrubri (Contrubrian Gauls)
 Corseis = Corsi (Corsicans)
 Cossurensibus = Cossurienses
 Delmateis = Dalmatae (Dalmatians)
 Eleatibus = Eleates
 Etrusceis = Etrusci (Etruscans)
 Falisceis = Falisci (Faliscans)
 Galleis = Galli (Gauls)
 Germaneis = Germani
 Geteis = Getae
 Herniceis = Hernici (Hernicians)
 Hispaneis = Hispani
 Histreis = Histri (Istrians)
 Iapudibus = Iapydes
 Illurieis = Illyri (Illyrians)
 Insubribus = Insubres (Insubrian Gauls)
 Judaeeis = Judaei (Jews)
 Karneis = Carni
 Latineis = Latini (Latins)
 Lavinieis = Lavinii (should be Lanuvii)
 Liguribus = Ligures (Ligurians)
 Lucaneis = Lucani (Lucanians)
 Lusitaneis = Lusitani (Lusitanians)
 Macedonibus = Macedones (Macedonians)
 Marseis = Marsi (Marsians)
 Medullineis = Medullini
 Messapieis = Messapii (Messapians)
 Nequinatibus = Nequinates
 Numideis = Numidi (Numidians)
 Palaeopolitaneis = Palaeopolitani (Palaeopolitans)
 Partheis = Parthi (Parthians)
 Parthineis = Parthi (Parthians)
 Pedaneis = Pedani
 Peicentibus = Picentes (Picentines)
 Poeneis = Punici (Carthaginians)
 Privernatibus = Privernates
 Regineis = Rhegini
 Sabineis = Sabini (Sabines)
 Sallentineis = Sallentini
 Salluveis = Saluvii
 Samnitibus = Samnites
 Sardeis = Sardi (Sardinians)
 Sassinatibus = Sassinates
 Satricaneis = Satricani
 Scordisteis = Scordisci
 Scytheis = Scythi (Scythians)
 Siculeis = Siculi (Sicels)
 Sidicineis = Sidicini
 Soraneis = Sorani
 Stoeneis = Stoeni
 Tarentineis = Tarentines
 Tarquiniensibus = Tarquinienses
 Thraecibus = Thraci (Thracians)
 Tiburtibus = Tiburtines
 Tusceis = Tusci (Etruscans)
 Veientibus = Veientes
 Veliterneis = Veliterni
 Vocontieis = Vocontii
 Volsceis = Volsci (Volscians)
 Volsonibus = Volsinienses
 Vulcientibus = Vulcientes
 Vulsiniensibus = Volsinienses

Places

 Africa
 Albania
 Alpibus = Alpes (the Alps)
 Armenia
 Asia
 Cappadocia
 Cephallenia
 Cilicia
 Clastidium
 Corsica
 Creta Insula
 Hispania
 Illurico = Illyricum
 Hispania Celtiberia
 Gallia
 Hispania Citerior
 Hispania Ulterior
 Judaea
 Lusitania
 Macedonia
 Monte Albano = Mons Albanus (Mount Albanus)
 Paphlagonia
 Ponto = Pontus
 Sardinia
 Sicilia (Sicily)
 Syria
 Tauro monte = Montes Tauri (Taurus Mountains)
 Thraecia (Thrace)

Persons
 rege Antiocho = Antiochus III the Great
 rege Arvernorum Betuito = Bituitus, King of the Arverni
 rege Genfio = Gentius, King of the Ardiaei ("Genfio" an error)
 rege Jugurtha = Jugurtha, King of Numidia
 rege Mithridate IV = Mithridates VI of Pontus ("IV" an error)
 rege Perse = Perseus of Macedon
 rege Philippo = Philip V of Macedon
 rege Pyrrho = Pyrrhus of Epirus
 rege Siculorum Hierone = Hiero II of Syracuse ("King of the Sicels")
 Viridomaro = Viridomarus, a Gallic chieftain

Things
 classe Poenica = classis Poenica, the Carthaginian navy
 pacem = pax, peace
 pirateis = piratae, pirates

Footnotes

See also
 List of Roman consuls
 List of Roman dictators

References

Bibliography
 Theodor Mommsen et alii, Corpus Inscriptionum Latinarum (The Body of Latin Inscriptions, abbreviated CIL), Berlin-Brandenburgische Akademie der Wissenschaften (1853–present).
 René Cagnat et alii, L'Année épigraphique (The Year in Epigraphy, abbreviated AE), Presses Universitaires de France (1888–present).
 Rodolfo Lanciani, New Tales of Old Rome, Macmillan & Company, London (1901).
 John Edwin Sandys: Latin Epigraphy: an Introduction to the Study of Latin Inscriptions, Cambridge University Press (1919).
 Oxford Classical Dictionary, N. G. L. Hammond and H. H. Scullard, eds., Clarendon Press, Oxford (Second Edition, 1970).

 
Ancient timelines
Latin inscriptions
Fasti Capitolini
Roman calendar